Lake Hāwea is New Zealand's ninth largest lake.

The lake is in the Otago Region at an altitude of 348 metres. It covers 141 km² and reaches 392 metres deep.

Lake Hāwea is named after a Māori tribe who preceded the Waitaha people in the area.

Lake Hāwea stretches 35 kilometres from north to south. It lies in a glacial valley formed during the last ice age, and is fed by the Hunter River. Nearby Lake Wānaka lies in a parallel glacial valley eight kilometres to the west. At their closest point, a rocky ridge called The Neck, the lakes are only 1000 metres apart.

Lake Hāwea is dammed to the south by an ancient terminal moraine created some 10,000 years ago. In 1958 the lake was artificially raised 20 metres to store more water for increased hydroelectric power generation at the Roxburgh Dam.

The only flat land around the lake is at its southern end, surrounding its outflow into the Hāwea River, a short tributary of the Clutha 
/ Matau-au, which it joins near Albert Town. The settlement of Lake Hāwea is found at the lake's southern shore.

The lake is a popular resort, well used in the summer for fishing, boating and swimming. The nearby mountains and fast-flowing rivers allow for adventure tourism year-round, such as jetboating and skiing.

Māori history

For Māori, the Wānaka and Hāwea area was a natural crossroads. The Haast Pass led to the West Coast and its pounamu; the Cardrona Valley led to the natural rock bridge "Whatatorere" which was the only place that the Kawarau River and Clutha River / Mata-Au could be crossed without boats.  reed boats enabled a swift return downriver to the east coast.

The Cromwell basin supported a large population of moa, which were hunted to extinction about 500 years ago.

Until the early nineteenth century, the area was visited annually by Ngāi Tahu who sought pounamu in the mountains above the Haast River and hunted eels and birds over summer, returning to the east coast by descending the Clutha River / Mata-Au in reed boats.  Ngāi Tahu use of the land was ended by attacks by North Island tribes. In 1836, the Ngati Tama chief Te Puoho led a 100-person war party, armed with muskets, down the West Coast and over the Haast Pass: they fell on the Ngāi Tahu encampment between Lake Wānaka and Lake Hāwea, capturing 10 people and killing and eating two children. Although Te Puoho was later killed by the southern Ngāi Tahu leader Tuhawaiki, Maori seasonal visits to the area ceased.

The first European to see the lake was Nathaniel Chalmers in 1853. Guided by Reko and Kaikoura, he walked from Tuturau (Southland) to the lakes via the Kawarau River. He was stricken by dysentery, so his guides returned him down the Clutha in a reed boat.

Namesakes 
There have been three Royal New Zealand Navy ships named after the lake, one of which is still in active service.

See also 
 List of lakes in New Zealand
 Lakes of New Zealand

References

Other sources
 Hawea

Encyclopædia Britannica. Retrieved February 2006, from Encyclopædia Britannica Premium Service.

Lakes of Otago